Lembo is a surname. Notable people with the surname include:

Alejandro Lembo (born 1978), Uruguayan footballer
Cláudio Lembo (born 1934), Brazilian lawyer, politician and academic
Kevin Lembo, American politician
Pete Lembo (born 1970), American football player and coach
Steve Lembo (1926–1989), American baseball player

See also
Lembos, Hellenistic-era light warship